Hills is an unincorporated community in Clermont County, in the U.S. state of Ohio.

History
A variant name was Hills Station. A post office called Hills Station was established in 1870, and remained in operation until 1925. Besides the post office, Hills Station had a country store and a depot on the Cincinnati and Marietta Railroad.

References

Unincorporated communities in Clermont County, Ohio
Unincorporated communities in Ohio